Cymbiola laminusa is a species of sea snail, a marine gastropod mollusk in the family Volutidae.

Distribution
This marine species occurs off the Philippines.

Original description
 Poppe G.T., Tagaro S.P. & Bail P. (2011) Notes on the genus Cymbiola in the Philippines, with the redefinition of Cymbiola cathcartiae Reeve, 1856 and the description of Cymbiola laminusa n.sp. Visaya 3(4): 76-87. [November 2011]
page(s): 76.

References

External links

 Worms Link

Volutidae